Guilty is the third studio album by English boy band Blue. It was released on 3 November 2003 in the United Kingdom and on 25 November in the United States. It debuted at number one on the UK Singles Chart after its release, and it was certified 2× Platinum in December 2003.

The album was particularly successful in the UK, Europe, Japan and New Zealand. "Guilty", "Signed, Sealed, Delivered I'm Yours", "Breathe Easy" and "Bubblin'" were released as singles from the album. "Guilty", co-written by Gary Barlow, was the most successful single from the album, peaking at number two in the UK.

Singles 
 "Guilty" — The debut single, released in October 2003. The single peaked at No. 2 on the UK Singles Chart, No. 29 on the Australian Top 40, at No. 14 in New Zealand and No. 6 in Ireland. The song has received a Silver sales status certification for sales of over 200,000 copies in the UK.
 "Signed, Sealed, Delivered I'm Yours" — The second single, released in December 2003, featuring guest vocals from Stevie Wonder. The song is a cover version of Stevie's number one hit. The single peaked at No. 11 on the UK Singles Chart, No. 31 on the Australian Top 100, No. 22 in New Zealand and No. 17 in Ireland.
 "The Gift" - A Japanese alternative single to "Signed, Sealed, Delivered I'm Yours", featuring the said track as a B-side. "The Gift" only appears on the Japanese version of Guilty. The single peaked at No. 3 on the Japan Hot 100. A music video was recorded and included on the Japanese edition of 4Ever Blue.
 "Breathe Easy" — The third single, released in March 2004. The single peaked at No. 4 on the UK Singles Chart. The song was produced by multi-platinum producers DEEKAY & co-written by Lee Ryan, Lars Halvor Jensen, and Michael Martin Larsson. The song has received a Bronze sales status certification for sales of over 100,000 copies in the UK. In Italy, an Italian-language version of the song, "A Chi Mi Dice", was released as a single instead.
 "Bubblin'" - The fourth and final single, released in June 2004. The single peaked at No. 9 on the UK Singles Chart. The single version of "Bubblin'" features vocals from L.A.D.E. In France, a French-language version of the song, "You & Me Bubblin'", was released a single instead. This version features vocals from French boyband LINK-UP.

Critical reception

Betty Clarke from The Daily Telegraph found that Guilty showed "Blue as we already know them: heavy on soul-puppy richness, light on meaning. It's easy listening in the most honourable sense, and there's no need to dress it up in seam-bursting bondage pants [...] What's left is a nifty little record." In a retrospective review for AllMusic, Sharon Mawer rated the album two out of five stars. She remarked that some songs on the album "were straying perilously close to Westlife territory and to many Blue fans, the most important thing about them was that they were not as bland as Westlife."

In a negative review, Chris Long from BBC Music, called the album "in equal parts, vapid, bland, hopelessly derivative, unimaginative and, occasionally, downright offensive." He further wrote that "there is not one moment of the ballad-heavy, drippy, sugar-sweet overdose of Guilty that deserves even a second listen [...] This is the sound of a band more interested in increasing their tabloid column inch count with their various late night shenanigans and celebrity ligging, than in their music. There is no effort, no emotion, no desire in any of the tunes on offer."

Track listing

 Guilty: Live from Wembley
In Japan, the band's live DVD, Guilty: Live from Wembley, was packed with a ten-track bonus CD.

Tour

Charts

Weekly charts

Year-end charts

Certifications

References

2003 albums
Blue (English band) albums
Albums produced by Stargate
Albums produced by Steve Robson
Albums produced by Cutfather